The 2021 World Enduro Championship is the 32nd season of the FIM World Enduro Championship. The season consists of eight events.

Steve Holcombe goes into the championship after winning both the EnduroGP and Enduro 2 classes in 2020. Andrea Verona is the reigning Enduro 1 champion, with Brad Freeman going into the season after taking the Enduro 3 title the previous season. 

ABC Communications stepped down from being the championship promoter at the end of the previous season, with the FIM taking direct control of the series for 2021.

Calendar
A six-round calendar was announced in September 2020.

EnduroGP

Riders Championship

Enduro 1

Riders Championship

Enduro 2

Riders Championship

Enduro 3

Riders Championship

Junior

Riders Championship

Junior 1

Riders Championship

Junior 2

Riders Championship

Youth

Riders Championship

Women

Riders Championship

Open World Cup

Open 2-Stroke

Riders Championship

Open 4-Stroke

Riders Championship

References 

Enduro World Championship